The migration of Moroccan Jews to Israel has been made all over the centuries. Moroccan Jews in Israel have been the founders of many pioneer neighborhoods in Jerusalem (Mahane Israel in 1867), Tel Aviv, Haifa, Tiberias and others.

After World War Two, in particular with the establishment of the state of Israel. Moroccan Jewish communities, constituting the largest of the Jewish communities in North Africa at the time. Pogroms in Oujda and Jerada and fear that Morocco's eventual independence from France would lead to the persecution of the country's Jews, led to a large-scale emigration. Approximately 28,000 Jews immigrated to Israel between 1948 and 1951. The initial enthusiasm dampened as Moroccan Jews complained of discrimination and contempt they encountered from Ashkenazi Jews in Israel.

Upon the return of Mohammed V and the consequent declaration of Morocco as an independent state in 1956, the Jews were granted Moroccan citizenship but with fewer freedoms than the dominant Muslim population, including restrictions on traveling abroad. Following pressures exerted by the Arab league in 1959, Jewish emigration became prohibited if the destination for their immigration was Israel, and therefore the immigration for the most-part took place illegally by means of the underground Jewish organization in Morocco, via Spain and France. Mossad and HIAS made a deal with King Hassan II to clandestinely transport Moroccan Jews to Israel in Operation Yachin, between 1961 and 1964; the peak of Moroccan immigration to Israel was in those 3 years.

By 1967 250,000 Jews had left Morocco, some fleeing to Europe and the USA whereas a large part of them immigrated to Israel. The Moroccan immigrants encountered many cross culture and integration difficulties that later became the characterizing features of this immigration. These cultural barriers and discrimination led to protestation and consequently a gradual change in Israel's political map.

All in all, 274,180 individuals are recorded to have emigrated from Morocco to Israel between the establishment of the state in 1948 and the year 2016.

Before the establishment of the State of Israel 

The rising French influence in Morocco at the beginning of the 20th century encouraged Moroccan Jews to enroll into French schools, receive a French education and integrate into French culture until 1940 when the Vichy laws came into effect and forbade Jewish attendance to French schools. After the Second World War and the establishment of the state of Israel, the Jewish Zionist organizations encouraged many Jewish families to leave Morocco and migrated to Israel legally, with the approval of the French rule at the time. Following the war, many young Moroccan Jews migrated to Israel in a bold move and joined "Gahal" forces that were fighting the War of Independence.

Prior to the signing of the Fez Treaty, which entailed French protection of Moroccan Jews, there was a mass escape of Jews from large cities such as Fez, Meknes, Rabat and Marrakech to the smaller towns and villages surrounding the cities. The overcrowding, the decline in the financial circumstances and the need to pray in secret motivated some young families to emigrate to Israel or move to neighboring Tunisia, which employed a more liberal policy for Jews. Rumors and letters which started arriving at synagogues told of Jews migrating to and settling in Israel, encouraging the Maghreb Jews to do so as well. The first community to make the move were Jews were living near the synagogue (the main synagogue) in Fez. About 60 to 80 young families migrated from 1908 to 1918, settling mainly in Jerusalem and Tiberias. Amongst the first families to settle in Jerusalem were; Ohana, and Zana, Mimeran Turgeman, and Aifraga. The Aifragan brothers, who were bankers back in Fez, could not adapt to life in Israel; they bid their cousins, the Zane family, goodbye in 1918, and moved to France and subsequently to Canada. The David, Zane and Turgeman families lived in the Jewish Quarter whilst the rest of the families lived in Mishkanot (English: Residence) and Sukkot Shalom (English: Peace Tent).

The migration was carried out largely through Tunisia, using small boats to travel from there to Israel. In the summer of 1911, a baby boy; Moshe Vezana, was born, a son to Simcha (Pircha) and David, aboard the ship on their way to Israel. Upon their arrival at Yafo port, the baby's Brit Milah was celebrated. The boy, which was a son to a 'Mugrabi' family, was recorded at times as a Tunisian native and at other times, as an Israeli native. All other eight brothers were born in the Old City of Jerusalem. It was a large family of Mughrabi; the greatest living inside the walls of the Old City, until their escape to Katamon due to War of Independence. The Maghreb Jewish community was small between the first and third migrations. Leading congregations in Jerusalem were primarily communities which immigrated from Iraq, Iran, Bukhara and Yemen.

After the establishment of the state of Israel 

Notable numbers of Moroccans came to Palestine, and subsequently Israel, during the 1947–1949 Palestine war. Many became disgruntled at what they perceived to be racist attitudes among the Ashkenazi towards them. In this early period the majority (70%) either wished to return to Morocco, or advised their families not to follow them to Israel, given the discrimination they encountered. Upon the establishment of the State of Israel, the majority Moroccan Jewry, which held Zionist-religious values, awoke to the possibility of migration to Israel.  After the establishment of Israel, the conditions for Jews in Morocco worsened due to increasing terrorism in the country and the hostile attitude towards the Jews by the local population. Morocco's worsening conditions for the Jews acted as a catalyst to encourage migration to Israel.

Riots in Oujda and Jerada 

The 1948 UN declaration of the founding of the state of Israel worsened the situation in Morocco. The Moroccan nationalist movement, carrying the flag of the Arab League, incited against the Jews, and the Moroccan nationalist press (namely the newspaper Al Alam) promoted hostility. A few days before pogroms broke out, death threats were made against Jews, and on the day of the June 7 massacre, no Arabs showed up to work for Jewish employers. Riots commenced in the city of Oujda at 9:30 in the morning. A mob armed with axes and knives gathered at the "shuk al Yahud" (Jewish market) in Oujda and killed five people, four Jewish and one French. Police eventually gained control and the crowd dispersed. In a nearby area, a group of Muslims gathered, armed with axes, picks and knives, and rode on buses towards the coal mining town of Jerada. In Jarada, this group spread a rumor that a Jew murdered a Muslim, triggering a massacre of 38 Jews, including the community's Rabbi (Rabbi Moshe Cohen), his wife, his mother and his three children. A total of 44 people were murdered that day, and another 55 were wounded by rioters in the cities of Jerada and Oujda. Additionally, shops and homes of Jews were looted. The French military court in Casablanca tried 35 rioters for the massacre. Two defendants were sentenced to death, two to hard labor for life, and the rest to a variety of different penalties.

Of the approximately 40,000 Moroccans who emigrated to Israel from 1949 to 1954, some 6% (2,466) returned to Morocco. In 1950, the immigration office in Marseilles handling prospective North African immigrants wrote that  "these abject human beings" would have to be kneaded to shape them into Israeli citizens. Complaints were made about the influx of 'orientals', 'human refuse' and 'backward people'.  The year 1954 saw additional pogroms against Moroccan Jews, considerable theft of property, and arson at "Kol Israel Haverim" schools. These incidents increased the emigration rate of Moroccan Jews.

Policy Instated by Mohammed V 

When Mohammed V returned from exile, he decided he wanted the Jews to remain in Morocco after its independence from France in 1956; Jewish citizens were given equal rights. King Mohammed V was willing to integrate the Jews in the parliament and position them in prominent roles. The League of Arab states began operating in Morocco, influencing Morocco's political parties and causing anti-Semitism, leading the Moroccan government to refuse to recognize the State of Israel. This environment caused less affluent Jews to request to leave Morocco as soon as possible. Following the mass exodus, which did not please the Moroccan government, Zionism was outlawed and defined as a serious crime in 1959, and immigration to Israel was banned, forcing Moroccan Jews to flee the country by sea only, towards Spain or France. Following the emigration ban, a large number of international organizations cooperated with the Israeli government to do everything in their capacity to persuade Moroccan authorities to allow Jewish citizens of Morocco to leave the country. Representatives of the various Jewish organizations succeeded in forming good relations with the Moroccan authorities, however they failed to convince them to allow the Jews to leave. Nevertheless, Israel had sent dozens of Mossad officers to North Africa who carried out an operation ("operation frame") that enabled illegal immigration of Moroccan Jews. Many local young people joined the operation. Between the years 1948 - 1955 around 70,000 Jews left Morocco. Between the years 1955 - 1961 around 60,000 Jews left Morocco.

Emigration under Hassan II of Morocco

Policy changed with the accession of Hassan II of Morocco in 1961. After the US provided food support to Morocco in the drought of 1957, Hassan II agreed to accept a $100 per-capita bounty from the American Hebrew Immigrant Aid Society, which acted as a cover for Israeli emigration agents, for each Jew who emigrated from Morocco—a total of $500,000 for the first 50,000 Moroccan Jews, followed by $250 for each Jew thereafter. Between the years 1961 - 1967 around 120,000 Jews left Morocco.

The Six-Day War in 1967 led to another wave of emigration of Jews from Morocco, primarily to France, but also to Canada, the United States, Israel and other countries.

The Disaster of "Egoz" (Nut) Ship 

In 1961 the ship Egoz (nut) which held 44 illegal immigrants drowned in the sea on its way to Israel.
After the sinking of Egoz, pressure was exerted on Morocco and a secret treaty was signed with King Hassan II and consequently a massive exodus of Jews from Casablanca port was carried out under the supervision of General Oufkir. Some Jews came to Israel and some immigrated to France and other countries.

Integration of Moroccan Jews in Israel 

Immigration of Moroccan Jews to Israel encountered many difficulties. The new immigrants who were housed in transit camps, brought different ways of life and thought with them, which were misunderstood by the many immigrants originating from Europe. Most notable was the complaint of the Moroccan hot temper, which clashed with the neighbors' culture and slower temper. This was the origin of a stereotypical, derogatory nickname that stuck to these immigrants - Maroko Sakin / "Morocco knife."
The cultural gap and the overt and covert discrimination caused unrest across Israel. Already in the early years of statehood, with the establishment of the policy of population dispersal, there began to be signs of a struggle against the settlement coordinators who tried to halt the abandonment of settlements on the borders of Israel. The transition of Moroccans from villages on the frontier to the city and their rejection of an agricultural lifestyle was assumed to indicate their refusal to participate in productive enterprises and the Judaization of the land that the state intended for them, and an active strategy of dealing with separation and socialization processes which the country implemented in the 1950s.
Discriminatory policies led to, among other things, an active protest whose two most prominent manifestations were the Wadi Salib events, led by David Ben-Arush against ongoing discrimination and the establishment of the Black Panthers movement. Their goal was to promote their social status and they fought passionately to earn their place in Israeli society. It took eighteen more years, after the events in 1977 in Wadi Salib for the North African immigrants to be heard clearly in national politics. In the 1977 revolution, their demographic power became evident where they succeeded in replacing the Mapai government by the Likkud led by Menachem Begin. Many of the first and second generation of immigrants from Islamic countries (the "second Israel") felt that this change in regime would give them a voice and influence over the leadership of the state, which had previously been denied to them during Mapai's reign.

Nowadays, descendants of Moroccan immigration are found in the forefront in Israel in versatile and leading roles, in management, leading companies, in the command of the army, politics, sports and culture. Descendants of the Moroccan community now constitute one of the pillars of Israeli culture in such areas as television, theater, literature, song, poetry, and film.

Interpretations 
In Jewish Morocco, Emily Gottreich presents different views in the discussion about "whose fault it was that the Jews, acknowledged today on (almost) all sides as “true” Moroccans, left their ancestral land": In her words: blame the colonial powers for having destabilized the traditional social structures that had long sustained the Jews. The younger generation of Moroccans blames the Istiqlal for failing to be more inclusive. Popular opinion blames the Zionists for having “stolen” Morocco’s Jews. Zionists, meanwhile, tend to blame Moroccan Muslims as a whole for having endangered Jewish lives during tense times. Scholarly opinions are divided but generally grant more agency to Moroccan Jews themselves, such as Michael Laskier’s descriptions of the departure of Morocco’s Jews as a “self-liquidation process.” (Ironically, Islamists’ accusations of Jewish treachery likewise grant Jews more agency, however nefarious in nature.) Moroccan Jews themselves seem to still be working it out, with their views depending heavily on their present location and circumstances.

See also
Moroccan Jews
Moroccan Jews in Israel
Operation Yachin
Operation Mural

References 

1. CBS; Statistical Abstract of Israel, 2009

 
Jewish Moroccan history
 
Jewish exodus from Arab and Muslim countries
 
Zionism in Morocco